Gillespie Field may refer to:

 Gillespie Field in El Cajon, California, United States (FAA/IATA: SEE)
 Gillespie Field station
 Gillespie Field (Maine) in Meddybemps, Maine, United States (FAA: 66B)

See also 
 Gillespie County Airport in Fredericksburg, Texas, United States (FAA: T82)
 Gillespie Airport (Tennessee), a former airfield in Nashville, Tennessee, United States